Johor Darul Tazim League is the state football league in Johor. The league is managed by the Johor Football Association. The league has been established since 1922 albeit undergoes multiple iteration of structures until its current structure took place.

History

Old Structure
In 2014, the league was called as PBNJ State league or Johor State League consist of multiple team based in state of Johor competing for spot of promotion to the FAM League. Several clubs from the league has been promoted to play in the Malaysian League.

List of clubs PBNJ State League 2014:
Muar Municipal Council
Johor Bahru City Council
Johor Linkedua
SAJ Holdings
PKENJ
Pasir Gudang United
Royal Johor Military Force
SSTMI
Melodi Jaya

New Structure
Johor Football Association (Johor FA) has developed a new structure of managing a football association that goes beyond having a strong team competing for honours, but also being more involved in educating youths in Johor on living a healthy lifestyle. It is designed with the vision of Tunku Ismail Ibni Sultan Ibrahim, The Crown Prince of Johor, along with the input from legendary footballer Johan Cruyff.

The blueprint of the Johor football project including the creation of multiple youth leagues managed by Johor FA. The state leagues will be a restricted age competition as the purpose of this leagues mainly to produce a better younger football players from Johor which then will be supplied to the Johor teams playing in the Malaysian League.

Most of the old teams which mostly based on corporate and government sector related sponsors has been disbanded and team with a district based were resurrect again after a long dormant state to be the base of the league in order to promote local area football community. Teams with the ethnic related players also was invited to join in order to promote more players from those ethnic to join the local football scene. The league which were created as follows.

Johor Darul Tazim League (HM Sultan of Johor Cup)
U-20 Johor Darul Tazim League (HRH Crown Prince of Johor Cup)
U-18 Johor Darul Tazim League (Tunku Temenggong Johor Cup)
U-16 Johor Darul Tazim League (Tunku Panglima Johor Cup)
U-14 Johor Darul Tazim League (Tunku Putera Johor Cup)
U-12 Johor Darul Tazim League (Tunku Laksamana Johor Cup)

Johor Darul Tazim League
HM Sultan of Johor Cup took place at Batu Pahat District Office on September 15, 2015.
 The tournament,  will be held from September 17–19, 2015 and eight districts compete for the prestigious trophy, which has been competed for in the last 37 years. The eight teams are – Johor Bahru, Ledang, Kulai, Muar, Mersing, Batu Pahat, Kota Tinggi and Kluang – will be divided into two groups based on an upcoming draw. The tournament will use a round-robin system for the group stage followed by a knockout format for the semi-finals and final to decide the winners. The tournament involving players between the age of 21 to 28 years old.

For 2018 season, Clubs which earns their promotion will be promoted to the fourth level league, the Malaysia M4 League for 2019 season.

Champions 
2018 : Johor Bahru
2019 : Kluang FA

Youth League

U-20 Johor Darul Tazim League
An U-20 tournament in the Johor Darul Tazim League, the HRH Crown Prince of Johor Cup, will begin from September 1 to 16 involving 12 teams which will be divided by district zones. Besides district teams, two more teams, the Johor Chinese Football Association and the Johor Indians Football Association, will be participating as well. Here are the competing teams according to their respective zones;

North Zone
Tangkak
Segamat
Muar
West Zone
Johor Chinese Football Association
Pontian
Batu Pahat
East Zone
Mersing
Kluang
Johor Indians Football Association
South Zone
Kota Tinggi
Kulai
Johor Bahru

U-18 Johor Darul Tazim League
A championship in the Johor Darul Tazim League, the U-18 Youth Cup, will be contested from 11 to 26 August 2016. The league involving 12 teams, which will be divided into the following four zones:

North Zone
Tangkak
Segamat
Muar
West Zone
Johor Chinese Football Association
Pontian
Batu Pahat
East Zone
Mersing
Kluang
Johor Indian Football Association
South Zone
Kota Tinggi
Kulai
Johor Bahru

Matches will be played according to the zones for three days starting from 11 to 13 August 2016, while the semi-finals will be on 20 August 2016 and the final on 26 August 2016.

U-16 Johor Darul Tazim League
The 2016 Tunku Panglima Johor Cup, the U-16 Johor Darul Tazim League, has kicked off from 21 July 2016 involving 12 district teams. Besides them, there are two more teams participating in it – Johor Chinese Football Association and Johor Indian Football Association.

Teams competing in 2016 edition:
  Ledang F.A.
  Segamat F.A.
  Muar F.A.
  Pontian F.A.
  Batu Pahat F.A.
  Mersing F.A.
  Kluang F.A.
  Kota Tinggi F.A.
  Kulai F.A.
  Johor Bahru F.A.
  Johor Indian Football Association (JIFA)
  Johor Chinese Football Association (JCFA)

U-14 Johor Darul Tazim League
The 2016 Tunku Putera Johor Cup will be held from 22 September and the final will be played on 7 October 2016. The league will features 12 teams from all around Johor.

The league involving 12 teams, which will be divided into the following four zones:

North Zone
Ledang
Segamat
Muar
West Zone
Johor Chinese Football Association
Pontian
Batu Pahat
East Zone
Mersing
Kluang
Johor Indian Football Association
South Zone
Kota Tinggi
Kulai
Johor Bahru

U-12 Johor Darul Tazim League

The 2015 Tunku Laksamana Johor Cup was held on 27 November 2015 at Padang Dataran, Pasir Gudang with 20 teams competing for the trophy. In 2016, the tournament format was changed with an increased age from U-11 to U-12 players. Further changes will have 12 teams competing in the tournament following the same format as other age-restricted tournament under Johor Darul Tazim League.

The league involving 12 teams, which will be divided into the following four zones:

North Zone
Ledang
Segamat
Muar
West Zone
Johor Chinese Football Association
Pontian
Batu Pahat
East Zone
Mersing
Kluang
Johor Indian Football Association
South Zone
Kota Tinggi
Kulai
Johor Bahru

References

4
Sport in Johor